Waterford Junior Hurling Championship is the third-tier hurling competition organized by the Waterford County Board of the Gaelic Athletic Association. The competition is confined to clubs in Waterford in Ireland. The winners usually will play in the senior grade the following year for the Waterford Intermediate Hurling Championship. They will also represent Waterford GAA in the Munster Junior Club Hurling Championship.

Qualification for subsequent competitions

Munster Junior Club Hurling Championship
The Waterford JHC winners qualify for the Munster Junior Club Hurling Championship. It is the only team from County Waterford to qualify for this competition. The Waterford JHC winners enter the Munster Junior Club Hurling Championship at the __ stage. For example, 2013 winner Ballysaggart won the Munster JHC, as did 2014 winner Modeligo and 2017 winner Ardmore.

All-Ireland Junior Club Hurling Championship
The Waterford JHC winners — by winning the Munster Junior Club Hurling Championship — may qualify for the All-Ireland Junior Club Hurling Championship, at which they would enter at the __ stage. For example, 2013 Waterford JHC winner Ballysaggart contested the All-Ireland Championship Final at Croke Park (a game which went to replay), while 2017 winner Ardmore (featuring Séamus Prendergast) won the All-Ireland Championship title after extra-time, also at Croke Park.

Roll of honour

References

External links
Waterford on Hoganstand

3
Junior hurling county championships